

See also

 Education in Ghana
 List of Senior High Schools in Ghana

Schools

Schools
Ghana